Esmir Ahmetović (born 17 January 1991) is a Bosnian footballer.

Club career
Born in Srebrenica, SR Bosnia and Herzegovina, he played with NK Tuzla in Bosnian third-tier, before joining Serbian SuperLiga side FK Jagodina in the winter break of the 2011–12 season. He had a 2-weeks trial and impressed Jagodina coach Simo Krunić who gave green light for signing a 3-year contract with Ahmetović.  However, still young and facing tough competition, he failed to make a league debut with Jagodina, so in summer 2012 he went on loan to the historical Bosnian side FK Sloboda Tuzla which had been relegated from the Bosnian Premier League and was now facing a season in the First League of the Federation of Bosnia and Herzegovina to fight for their return to the top-tier.  Ahmetović played with them the first half of the 2012–13 season, but during the winter break he returned to Jagodina and stayed in the Serbian SuperLiga side in the second half of the season. 

Ahmetović then signed with ACS Poli Timișoara in what was their inaugural season in the Romanian top-tier, and made 2 appearances with them in the 2013–14 Liga I.  However, they finished 16th out of 18 clubs, and ended up relegated and Ahmetović left the club at the end of the season.

In March 8,2016, he signed with Bosnian second-tier-side FK Bratstvo Gračanica.

References

1991 births
Living people
People from Srebrenica
Association football midfielders
Bosnia and Herzegovina footballers
Bosnia and Herzegovina expatriate footballers
FK Jagodina players
FK Sloboda Tuzla players
ACS Poli Timișoara players
NK Bratstvo Gračanica players
FK Sinđelić Beograd players
FK Radnički Lukavac players
HNK Orašje players
FK Zvijezda 09 players
First League of the Federation of Bosnia and Herzegovina players
Liga I players
Premier League of Bosnia and Herzegovina players
Expatriate footballers in Serbia
Bosnia and Herzegovina expatriate sportspeople in Serbia
Expatriate footballers in Romania
Bosnia and Herzegovina expatriate sportspeople in Romania